Open High School:

 Open High School (Virginia)
 Open High School of Utah
 Open High School Sydney